Darkthrone Holy Darkthrone is a tribute album to the Norwegian black metal band Darkthrone, with contributions from other leading Norwegian black metal bands. This album was released in 1998 by Moonfog Productions to mark the band's 10th anniversary.

Track listing

Gorgoroth's line-up on track 7 consists of Infernus and Tormentor.

References

1998 albums
Tribute albums